The music of Qatar is based on sea folk poetry, song and dance.  Traditional dances in Doha are performed on Friday afternoons; one such dance is the Ardah, a stylized martial dance performed by two rows of dancers who are accompanied by an array of percussion instruments, including al-ras (a large drum whose leather is heated by an open fire), tambourines and cymbals with small drums. Other folk instruments include the oud and rebaba, both string instruments, as well as the ney.

Male-only folk music

Sea music

Work songs relating to the sea are the most recurrent type of folk music, particularly songs pertaining to pearl hunting. Each song, varying in rhythm, would narrate a different activity of the pearling trip, including spreading the sails, diving, and rowing the ships. Collective singing was an integral part of each pearling trip, and each ship had a designated singer, known locally as al naham. Singing was used to encourage crew members to work harder during the pearling drip, in addition to providing entertainment while they were resting.

Dance
Ardah, a folkloric dance, is still practiced in Qatar. The dance is performed with two rows of men opposite of one another, each of whom may or may not be wielding a sword, and is accompanied by drums and spoken poetry.

The two main types of ardah in the Persian Gulf states are land ardah (ardah barriyya) and sea ardah (ardah bahri). Qatar's ardah is a mixture of the two. In some performances, men wear land ardah attire at a beach setting and are supported by sea band drumming.

Female-only folk music
women primarily sang work songs associated with daily activities such as wheat grinding and cooking. The songs were performed collectively in small groups and varied in specificity - some pertained to general themes, whereas others were related to specific processes.

Men would also sing when returning pearl ships were sighted. After a sighting was made, they would gather around the seashore where they would clap and sing about the hardships of pearl diving.

Dance
Public performances by women were practiced only on two annual occasions. This was usually done in the weeks preceding Eid al-Fitr and Eid al-Adha. It was one of the most popular musical practices among Qatari women in previous decades. Each moradah would begin with a prayer to Muhammad. After this, the women would praise tribal leaders and elders, repeating each verse twice before a new verse was introduced. It was performed with two rows of women opposite of each other with the lead singers at the far ends, thus forming a three-sided rectangle. Moradah's dance consisted of all the women in each row swaying their bodies and moving their arms up and down while their hands were interlaced. For the most part, the practice was abandoned during the 1950s, though it is still sometimes practiced at the end of weddings. There have been efforts by Qatar's ministry of culture to reintegrate the practice in Qatari society.

There were two main instruments used during a performance: , a type of tambourine and al tabl, a longitudinal drum. Thematically,  songs are cheerful as they rejoice the marriage which is taking place. The lyrics are derived from  verse, a type of Arabic poetry and were generally symbiotic in nature.  is still practiced by some classes of Qatari society.

Folk instruments

Percussion instruments are most popular in Qatari folk music. Galahs, a tall clay jar, was commonly used as a musical instrument by pearl fishermen. Tin drinking cups known as tus or tasat were also used, usually in conjunction with a tabl, a longitudinal drum beaten with a stick.

Contemporary music
Local music artists are subject to many barriers in Qatar, such as lack of awareness, high prices of recording studios and a deficiency of agents.

Music institutions
In August 1980, the Ministry of Information established a subsidiary organization to serve as a music academy, referring to it as "the Institute". An academy building was provided to the institute by the government and it began classes on 1 October 1980 with an initial capacity for 20 aspiring musicians.

Qatar Foundation was responsible for commissioning the Qatar Music Academy in Katara Cultural Village in January 2011. Although the academy's primary focal point is providing musical education for children and teenagers from 5 to 18 years old, it also provides education for individuals not falling within that age bracket through its 'music for all' program.

Qatar Philharmonic Orchestra
The Qatar Philharmonic Orchestra was formed in 2007 at the behest of Qatar Foundation with an initial budget of $14 million.

Recording companies
The first Qatari record label was established in January, 2015 by Dana Al Fardan as DNA Records.

Arabic/gulf music
Many contemporary Qatari singers perform what is popularly known as khaliji ('gulf') music. Notable male artists in this genre include Fahad Al Kubaisi, the first artist out of the Arab states of the Persian Gulf to be nominated for a Grammy award, Essa Al Kubaisi, Ali Abdul Sattar, and Bader Al Rayes.

Metal/rock
Naser Mestarihi, a Qatari born Jordanian-Pakistani singer-songwriter and multi-instrumentalist became the first rock/metal musician to release an album out of Qatar. He was also a member of Qatar's first ever metal band Asgard Legionnaires.

References

Further reading
 Bahrain and Qatar, being next to each other, in the past exchanged musicians continuously.

External links
Youtube clip of The Ghalali traditional music and dance group performing a Fijiri song in a village near Muharraq, Bahrain, October 7 2009